The Dragonnades were a French government policy instituted by King Louis XIV in 1681 to intimidate Huguenot (Protestant) families into converting to Catholicism. This involved the billeting of ill-disciplined dragoons in Protestant households with implied permission to abuse the inhabitants and destroy or steal their possessions. The soldiers employed in this role were satirized as "missionary dragoons".

Background
With the Edict of Nantes in 1598, Henry IV had ended France's Wars of Religion by granting a relatively high degree of toleration to the Huguenots, as well as political and military privileges. The latter were abolished in 1629 under the Peace of Alès following the Huguenot rebellions, but the provisions of the Edict granting religious tolerance were largely maintained under the governments of the Cardinals Richelieu and Mazarin.

Louis XIV, however, aimed to have religious uniformity in his kingdom. Initially he offered the Huguenots financial incentives to convert, but this had limited effect. By the late 1670s he decided upon a harsher policy. He began to order the destruction of Huguenot churches and the closure of Huguenot schools.

Implementation
Louis XIV combined legal persecution with a policy of terrorizing recalcitrant Huguenots who refused to convert to Catholicism by billeting both dragoons and ordinary infantrymen in their homes.  The soldiers were instructed to harass and intimidate the occupants, in order to persuade them to either convert to the state religion or emigrate.  As mobile mounted infantry, the 14 regiments of dragoons in the French Army of the period were sometimes used for what would now be called internal security duties, and were an effective instrument for persecuting the Huguenots.

The application of selective and coercive troop quartering had been initiated by the intendant René de Marillac in Poitou, in 1681. With the permission of the Secretary of State for War François-Michel le Tellier, Marquis de Louvois, Marillac systematically lodged troops with Protestants, in the expectation that existing laws exempting households newly converted to Catholicism from this practice would spur conversions. Billeted troops got so far out of hand that, after a series of reprimands in letters, the Marquis de Louvois was forced to recall Marillac from Poitou. The Marquis himself was to be subsequently blamed for originating the dragonnades but research has established that responsibility rested with more junior officials such as de Marillac, ambitious for royal favour. Louvois did not oppose the policy but was concerned with the negative impact on the discipline of the soldiers involved.

Outcome
The persecution of Protestants caused outrage in England and created a wave of literature in protest against the inhumane treatment of Huguenots, thousands of whom fled to England to seek asylum. The dragonnades caused Protestants to flee France, even before the Edict of Fontainebleau of 1685 revoked the religious rights granted them by the Edict of Nantes.  Most Huguenot refugees sought refuge in countries such as Switzerland, the Dutch Republic (from where some migrated to the Cape Colony in southern Africa), England, and the German territories (notably Brandenburg-Prussia). Smaller numbers also fled to New France, the English colonies in North America, or Lutheran Scandinavia. Huguenots also fled to Brazil, where they founded the city of Saint-Louis-de-Maragnan (present-day São Luís, in the state of Maranhão), which is the only Brazilian capital founded by the French. Today among the remnants of the French Huguenot colonization of the city, there is a museum dedicated to the Huguenots, and the place where the Huguenots built a fort has become the city hall, but retains its original name of La Ravardière.

On January 17, 1686, Louis XIV claimed that his policies had caused the Protestant population of France to decline from 800,000-900,000 to 1,000–1,500.  Though he greatly exaggerated, their numbers did decline significantly. According to Hans J. Hillerbrand, an expert on Protestantism, Huguenot numbers had been steadily declining since the St. Bartholomew's Day massacre in 1572. The campaign ultimately proved detrimental to France's economy, as many were part of the nascent urban bourgeoisie, and many others possessed skills such as silkweaving, clock-making, silversmithing, and optometry.

See also 
Camisards
French Wars of Religion
Persecution of Huguenots under Louis XV
Religion in France

References

Bibliography

External links
  Musée Virtuel du Protestantisme Français: "Les dragonnades (1681–1685)"—

Huguenot history in France
Persecution of the Huguenots
Louis XIV
Religion in the Ancien Régime
1681 establishments in France
17th century in France